Zoe Daniel (born 28 November 1972) is an Australian journalist, politician, columnist and broadcaster. She is the independent member of parliament for the Division of Goldstein following the 2022 Australian federal election, having defeated the incumbent Liberal Party member Tim Wilson.

Early life 
Her father is the former Essendon footballer Peter Daniel. She moved to Launceston, Tasmania, when she was two years old, when her father was working there as a football coach.

Journalism career

Australian Broadcasting Corporation 

In 2004, Daniel reported on the Summer Olympics.
 
While working in Africa she reported on the regime of Robert Mugabe in Zimbabwe, Sierra Leone civil war, the Darfur genocide and South Sudan.
 
In 2009, she moved to Phnom Penh where she reported on the Khmer Rouge tribunal.
 
From 2010 until 2013, Daniel took up a posting in Bangkok as the ABC's Southeast Asian correspondent. At the time, Daniel's posting while a mother of young children was unprecedented for ABC correspondents. During her time there she reported on the 2010 Thai political protests and interviewed Aung San Suu Kyi.
 
After 27 years with ABC News, Daniel decided to finish her career with the organisation, leaving in July 2020.

The New Daily 
 Daniel was writing a column for The New Daily.

Politics 

Daniel was endorsed by Voices of Goldstein as an independent candidate to run in the 2022 federal election in the seat of Goldstein. Her candidacy was endorsed by former member for Indi, Cathy McGowan, former leader of the Liberal Party, John Hewson, and minister in the Fraser government and former Liberal member for Goldstein, Ian Macphee.

Daniel is a self-described swinging voter, as a consequence of her father's "negative experience of party politics". She describes herself as a "social progressive, economic conservative". She cast her vote for the Liberals at the 2016 Australian federal election on the basis of what she perceived to be Malcolm Turnbull's commitment to addressing the climate crisis. During the campaign, she stated that she had campaigned for "faster and stronger action on climate change, restoration of integrity and trust in politics and real equality and safety for women."

Daniel is part of a network of female community independents that campaigned in safe Liberal seats.

Daniel was successful at the election, defeating the incumbent, Tim Wilson.

Personal life 
Daniel is married to husband Rowan and has two children. She lives in Hampton.

Daniel is a supporter and member of the Essendon Football Club.

Bibliography 

 Storyteller: A Foreign Correspondent's Memoir, ABC Books, 2014, ISBN 978-0733332319
 Angel: Through My Eyes – Natural Disaster Zones, Allen & Unwin, 2018, ISBN 978-1760113773
 Greetings from Trumpland: How an unprecedented presidency changed everything, Harper Collins, 2021, ISBN 978-0733341519

References 

Living people
Australian columnists
Australian women columnists
Australian political journalists
Australian television talk show hosts
Online journalists
Journalists from Melbourne
ABC News (Australia) presenters
Australian women journalists
Independent members of the Parliament of Australia
Members of the Australian House of Representatives for Goldstein
Women members of the Australian House of Representatives
Politicians from Launceston, Tasmania
Politicians from Melbourne
1972 births